Alan Geraldo de Melo Santos, or simply Alan (born April 16, 1983), is a Brazilian footballer. He is currently a free agent after leaving his most recent team, Fujieda MYFC.

Personal life
His twin brother Alex is also a professional footballer who plays for Tokushima Vortis in the J. League Division 2.

References

External links

1983 births
Living people
Brazilian footballers
Brazilian expatriate footballers
Expatriate footballers in Japan
Fujieda MYFC players
Association football forwards